Svenska Cupen 1968–69 was the fourteenth season of the main Swedish football Cup. The competition was concluded on 23 June 1969 with the Final, held at Råsunda, Solna. IFK Norrköping won 1-0 against AIK before an attendance of 7,832 spectators.

Qualifying round
For all results see SFS-Bolletinen - Matcher i Svenska Cupen.

First round
For all results see SFS-Bolletinen - Matcher i Svenska Cupen.

Second round
For all results see SFS-Bolletinen - Matcher i Svenska Cupen.

Third round
For all results see SFS-Bolletinen - Matcher i Svenska Cupen.

Fourth round
For all results see SFS-Bolletinen - Matcher i Svenska Cupen.

Fifth round
For all results see SFS-Bolletinen - Matcher i Svenska Cupen.

Quarter-finals
The 4 matches and one replay match in this round were played between 7 and 23 April 1969.

Semi-finals
The semi-finals in this round were played on 7 May 1969, the replay match was played on 18 May 1969.

Final
The final was played on 23 June 1969 at Råsunda.

Footnotes

References 

Svenska Cupen seasons
Cupen
Cupen
Sweden